Maricha is a census town within the jurisdiction of the Bhangar police station in the Bhangar I CD block in the Baruipur subdivision of the South 24 Parganas district in the Indian state of West Bengal.

Geography

Area overview
Baruipur subdivision is a rural subdivision with moderate levels of urbanization. 31.05% of the population lives in the urban areas and 68.95% lives in the rural areas. In the northern portion of the subdivision (shown in the map alongside) there are 10 census towns. The entire district is situated in the Ganges Delta and the northern part of the subdivision is a flat plain bordering the metropolis of Kolkata.

Note: The map alongside presents some of the notable locations in the subdivision. All places marked in the map are linked in the larger full screen map.

Location

Demographics
According to the 2011 Census of India, Maricha had a total population of 4,842, of which 2,456 (51%) were males and 2,386 (49%) were females. There were 634 persons in the age range of 0 to 6 years. The total number of literate persons in Maricha was 3,161 (75.12% of the population over 6 years).

Infrastructure
According to the District Census Handbook 2011, Maricha covered an area of 0.8063 km2. Among the civic amenities, the protected water supply involved overhead tank and service reservoir. It had 417 domestic electric connections. Among the educational facilities it had were 1 primary school, the nearest middle school, the nearest secondary school, the nearest senior secondary school and the nearest general degree college at Bhangar Raghunathpur 2.5/3 km away.

Transport
Maricha is on the State Highway 3.

Healthcare
Nalmuri Rural Hospital, with 30 beds, at Nalmuri, is the major government medical facility in the Bhangar I CD block.

References

Cities and towns in South 24 Parganas district
Neighbourhoods in Kolkata
Kolkata Metropolitan Area